Morbihan is a department in the administrative region of Brittany, situated in the northwest of France. It is named after the Morbihan (small sea in Breton), the enclosed sea that is the principal feature of the coastline. It had a population of 759,684 in 2019. It is noted for its Carnac stones, which predate and are more extensive than the Stonehenge monument in Wiltshire, England.

Three major military educational facilities are located in Guer, including École Spéciale Militaire de Saint-Cyr, the national military academy for officers.

History

Morbihan is one of the original 83 departments created on 4 March 1790 during the French Revolution. It was created from a part of the Duchy of Brittany.

In 1945 cadets from École Spéciale Militaire de Saint-Cyr, France's foremost military academy for officers, were relocated to Camp Coëtquidan (Camp de Coëtquidan) in Guer. This has been developed to include also  the École militaire interarmes (inter-services military school), for non-commissioned officers; and École Militaire du Corps Technique et Administratif (military school of the technical and administrative corps).

Geography 
Morbihan, part of the region of Brittany, is surrounded by the departments of Finistère, Côtes-d'Armor, Ille-et-Vilaine, and Loire-Atlantique, and the Atlantic Ocean on the southwest.

The Gulf of Morbihan has many islands: 365 according to legend. There are actually between 30 and 40, depending on how they are counted. There are also many islets that are too small for any development. Of these islands, all but two are privately owned: l'Île-aux-Moines and l'Île-d'Arz. Owners of the others include movie stars, fashion designers, and other wealthy "glitterati".

In the department of Morbihan, but outside the Gulf, there are four inhabited islands:
Belle Île
Groix
Houat
Hoëdic

Meaban, an island just outside the Port du Crouesty, is an ornithological reserve. Visitors are forbidden there.

Principal towns

The most populous commune is Lorient; the prefecture Vannes is the second-most populous. As of 2019, there are 6 communes with more than 15,000 inhabitants:

Demographics

Art and culture  
Many residents support maintenance and use of the Breton language, and there are numerous  advocates of bilingual education.

The painter Raymond Wintz (1884–1956) depicted locations around the Gulf of Morbihan.

Politics
As of 2014, the préfet of Morbihan is Jean-François Savy, previously head of the Prefectures of Ardennes and of Hautes-Alpes. The president of the Departmental Council is David Lappartient, elected in July 2021.

Current National Assembly Representatives

Tourism
 The Carnac stones, megalithic alignments of Carnac, are situated in Morbihan.
 Tourism office of Auray

See also
Cantons of the Morbihan department
Communes of the Morbihan department
Arrondissements of the Morbihan department
La Baule - Guérande Peninsula

References

External links

  Prefecture website
  Departmental Council website

  
   Cultural Heritage
  Tourism website
  Hiking in Morbihan

 
1790 establishments in France
Departments of Brittany
States and territories established in 1790